Impact investing refers to investments "made into companies, organizations, and funds with the intention to generate a measurable, beneficial social or environmental impact alongside a financial return". At its core, impact investing is about an alignment of an investor's beliefs and values with the allocation of capital to address social and/or environmental issues.

Impact investors actively seek to place capital in businesses, nonprofits, and funds in industries such as renewable energy, housing, healthcare, education, microfinance, and sustainable agriculture. Institutional investors, notably North American and European development finance institutions, pension funds and endowments have played a leading role in the development of impact investing.  Under Pope Francis, the Catholic Church has seen an increased interest in impact investing.

Impact investing occurs across asset classes; for example, private equity/venture capital, debt, and fixed income. Impact investments can be made in either emerging or developed markets, and depending on the goals of the investors, can "target a range of returns from below-market to above-market rates".

Development 
Historically, regulation—and to a lesser extent, philanthropy—was an attempt to minimize the negative social consequences (unintended consequences, externalities) of business activities. However, a history of individual investors using socially responsible investing to express their values exists, and such investing behavior is usually defined by the avoidance of investments in specific companies or activities with negative effects.

Simultaneously, approaches such as pollution prevention, corporate social responsibility, and triple bottom line began as measurements of non-financial effects, both inside and outside of corporations. In 2000, Baruch Lev of the NYU's Stern School of Business collated thinking about intangible assets in a book of the same name, which furthered thinking about the non-financial effects of corporate production.

Finally, around 2007, the term "impact investing" emerged. A commitment to measuring social and environmental performance, with the same rigor as that applied to financial performance, is a critical component of impact investing.

Current industry 
The number of funds engaged in impact investing grew quickly over a five-year period and a 2009 report from research firm the Monitor Group estimated that the impact investing industry could grow from around US$50 billion in assets to $500 billion in assets within the subsequent decade. Such capital may be deployed using a range of investment instruments, including equity, debt, real assets,  loan guarantees, and others. The growth of impact investing is partly attributed to the criticism of traditional forms of philanthropy and international development, which have been characterized as unsustainable and driven by the goals—or whims—of the corresponding donors.

Currently, impact investing is still only a small market when compared to the global equity market, estimated at US$61 trillion (market capitalization of domestic listed companies) by the World Bank in 2015. Impact investors managed US$114 billion in impact investing assets, a figure that serves as a best-available "floor" for the size of the impact investing market, according to GIIN's 2017 Annual Impact Investor Survey. The largest sectors by asset allocation were microfinance, energy, housing, and financial services.

Many development finance institutions, such as the British Commonwealth Development Corporation or Norwegian Norfund, can also be considered impact investors, because they allocate a portion of their portfolio to investments that deliver financial as well as social or environmental benefits.

Impact investing is distinguished from crowdfunding sites, such as Indiegogo or Kickstarter, because impact investments are typically debt or equity investments over US$1,000—with longer-than-traditional venture capital payment times—and an "exit strategy" (traditionally an initial public offering (IPO) or buyout in the for-profit startup sector) may be non-existent. Although some social enterprises are nonprofits, impact investing typically involves for-profit, social- or environmental-mission-driven businesses.

Organizations receiving impact investment capital may be set up legally as a for-profit, not-for profit, Benefit corporation, Low-profit limited liability company (L3C), Community interest company, or other designations that may vary by country. In much of Europe, these are known as "social enterprises".

The main activists in this market have been Impax Asset Management Group, which is a UK-based specialist in environmental impact investing, Sarasin and Partners, which has a history of pressing investee companies on sustainability issues, and Triodos Investment Management, which is a Netherlands-based manager which focuses on sustainability issues.

India is emerging as a major geography for impact investors according to consulting firm, McKinsey, with over $1.1 billion already invested as of 2016.

Institutional impact investing

Institutional investors 
Impact investments occur across asset classes and investment amounts. Among the best-known mechanism is private equity or venture capital. "Social venture capital", or "patient capital", impact investments are structured similarly to those in the rest of the venture capital community. Investors may take an active role mentoring or leading the growth of the company, similar to the way a venture capital firm assists in the growth of an early-stage company. Hedge funds and private equity funds may also pursue impact investing strategies.

Impact investment "accelerators" also exist for seed- and growth-stage social enterprises. Similar to seed-stage accelerators for traditional startups, impact investment accelerators provide smaller amounts of capital than Series A financings or larger impact investment deals. Most "impact investment accelerators" are nonprofits, raising grants from donors to pay for business development services; however, commercially orientated accelerators providing investment readiness and capital-raising advisory services are emerging.

Large corporations are also emerging as powerful mechanisms for impact investing. Companies that seek to create shared value through developing new products/services, or positively impacting their operations, are beginning to employ impact investments through their value chain, particularly their supply chain.

Impact investing can help organizations become self-sufficient by enabling them to carry out their projects and initiatives without having to rely heavily on donations and state subsidies.

There has been a growing interest in impact investing from faith-based investors, as they seek to align their investments with their core beliefs.

Increased supranational and pension cooperation 
Governments and national and international public institutions including development finance institutions have sought to leverage their impact-oriented policies by encouraging pension funds and other large asset owners to co-invest with them in impact-informed assets and projects, notably in the Global South. World Pensions Council and other US and European experts have welcome this course of action, insisting nonetheless that: Governments and international institutions need to do more if they truly seek to 'unlock' private sector capital in a meaningful way. They have to ask themselves the following questions: what are the concrete legal, regulatory, financial and fiduciary concerns facing pension fund board members? How can we improve emerging industry standards for impact measurement and help pension trustees steer more long-term capital towards valuable economic endeavors at home and abroad, while, simultaneously, ensuring fair risk-adjusted returns for future pensioners?

Mission investing by foundations 
Mission investments are investments made by foundations and other mission-based organizations to further their philanthropic goals, either with a portion or with the entirety of their endowment. They include any type of investment that is intended and designed to generate both a measurable social or environmental benefit and a financial return. For example, after the Heron Foundation's internal audit of its investments in 2011 uncovered an investment in a private prison that was directly contrary to the foundation's mission, the foundation developed and then began to advocate for a four-part ethical framework to endowment investments conceptualized as Human Capital, Natural Capital, Civic Capital, and Financial Capital.

Foundations that make investments aligned with related philanthropic work include the Bill & Melinda Gates Foundation, Soros Economic Development Fund, and Ford Foundation.

Program-related investments (PRIs) 
Program-related investments (PRIs) are investments, usually by foundations, into below-market rate or concessionary investments that are primarily made to achieve charitable or "programmatic" objectives rather than financial objectives. This category includes recoverable grants, below-market-rate loans, R&D or seed stage equity investments (stock), loan guarantees and volume guarantees. For private foundations, PRIs count towards the required 5 percent annual payout.

Mission-related investments (MRIs) 
Mission-related investments (MRIs) are investments, generally made from endowments, into mission-driven organizations that are expected to generate market-rate financial returns comparable to an ordinary investment of a similar type and risk profile. MRIs are designed to have both a positive social impact and contribute to the endowment's long-term financial stability and growth. Examples of MRIs include loans to mission-aligned non-profit organizations (e.g., charter schools, hospitals or research centers) that are expected to pay back loans with interest, as well as investments in for-profit social impact companies, social impact funds, socially responsible fixed income (bond) funds, impact-oriented private equity funds and public equity portfolios (stocks).

Impact investing by individuals 
Impact investing historically took place through mechanisms aimed at institutional investors. However, there are ways for individuals to participate in providing early stage or growth funding to such ventures.

Exchange-traded funds 

Exchange-traded funds like the SPDR Gender Diversity ETF from State Street are publicly traded and hence available to anyone with a stock brokerage account. MSCI offers 11 environmental, social and governance index ETFs, including popular low-carbon and sustainability indexes.

Syndicate or pooled investing 

Groups of angel investors focused on impact, where individuals invest as a syndicate also exist. Examples include Investors' Circle in the US, Clearly Social Angels in the United Kingdom and the global investor network Toniic.

Digital microfinance platforms 

Web-based investing platforms, which offer lower-cost investing services, also exist. As equity deals can be prohibitively expensive for small-scale transactions, microfinance loans, rather than equity investment, are prevalent in these platforms. MyC4, founded in 2006, allowed retail investors to loan to small businesses in African countries via local intermediaries, though the service permanently closed in 2019. Microplace was an early United States provider of such services which ceased taking on new loans in 2014, stating that its results "haven't scaled to the widespread social impact we aspire to achieve".

Impact investing in Asia 

Impact Investing in Asia is a burgeoning sector with many funds currently in play. In South East Asia, from 2007 to 2017, US$904 million impact capital was deployed by Private Impact Investors (PIIs) and US$11.9 million was deployed by Development Finance Institutions (DFIs).

Private equity and venture capital 

Impact investing organizations and funds also make equity investments like traditional private equity and venture capital funds, but only investments with developmental impact. According to a 2021 study by the Wharton School of the University of Pennsylvania venture capital has been dominating the impact investment space.

Gender lens investing 
Gender lens investing is a subsection of Impact Investing, and refers to investments which are "made into companies, organizations, and funds with the explicit intent to create a positive impact on gender". Investments which promote gender equity and address gender based issues can be made by investing in gender led enterprises, enterprises which promote gender equality through hiring, women in positions of authority, or in their supply chain, as well as supporting services which support, empower and develop capacity of women. Gender lens investing was created in response to the difficulty which woman face in accessing capital, as women globally have less access and higher barriers to obtaining capital.

Female entrepreneurs have routinely struggled to attract capital from male investors. In 2019 Fortune magazine reported that just 2.2% of all venture capital went to female founders. Taken together, all female founders raised less in capital than one e-cigarette manufacturer. Some have gone to great lengths to avoid experiencing gender discrimination. In 2017 the Telegraph reported on the founders of Witchsy who created an imaginary third male founder in order to converse with male investors.

Gender lens investing is growing rapidly. More than 100 funds are open to private investors. In 2018 the number of gender lens assets under management grow by 40% according to analysis by Veris Wealth Partners. Demand is rising with major banks offering gender lens bonds including NAG, Goldman Sachs, Merrill Lynch and many others.

See also
 Effective altruism
 Double bottom line
 Financial inclusion
 Social finance
 Social return on investment
 Socially responsible investing

References

Social finance
Investment
Corporate social responsibility
Economy and the environment